Trans Am is a three-piece American band from Bethesda, Maryland, that was one of the originators of "post-rock" in the mid-1990s. Their work combines elements of Krautrock, heavy metal, hardcore punk, synthpop, electronic music, and folk music. Since their inception, the group has toured with Tortoise, Pan Sonic, The Fucking Champs, and Tool.

Biography
Nathan Means (bass, keyboards, vocoder, vocals), Philip Manley (lead guitar, bass, keyboards, vocals), and Sebastian Thomson (drums, bass, keyboards, guitar, vocals) formed Trans Am in 1990 near Washington, D.C.
The band started as a HarDCore project but their sound evolved as the members finished college to include additional influences, such as new wave, classic rock, and experimental rock.
In 1995, they began recording their music, which until 1998 was almost entirely instrumental. Their sound is generally marked with acoustic and electronic drums, guitars, electronics, and a varying amount of often-heavily processed vocals. Instrumental virtuosity (especially on drums) is a focal point. All of their albums have been released on the Chicago-based independent record label Thrill Jockey.

Trans Am's self-titled debut, recorded after just a few rehearsals, contained instrumentals which were largely improvised versions of simple rock-oriented motifs based loosely on 1970s bands such as Boston, Bachman–Turner Overdrive, and Yes. The album was produced by John McEntire of labelmates Tortoise at Chicago's Idful Studios. Afterwards, the band opened for Tortoise on a brief US tour.

In the fall of 1996, Trans Am released a self-titled EP, which showed a greater reliance on electronics. The group expanded that approach to album length on Surrender to the Night (1997) and The Surveillance (1998). Their sound during this period was reminiscent of such acts as Kraftwerk, Can, and New Order, interspersed with more rock-oriented material. In 1996, they appeared on a split 12" with Wingtip Sloat, which accompanied the zine Tuba Frenzy. One track from that record, "Starjammer", was later included on the highbrow electronica label Mille Plateaux's double-CD compilation In Memoriam Gilles Deleuze. In their live shows, the band began to incorporate trigger devices and MIDI-wired beatboxes in order to perform their electronics-heavy songs. Around the time of the release of The Surveillance, Trans Am started to perform material with vocoder-heavy vocals by Nathan Means.

Their fourth album, Futureworld, came out in 1999. The first side of this album featured songs with vocoder and the second side had all instrumentals, including the sprightly "Cocaine Computer". A music video for the title song was filmed and released. In 2000, the group followed up with the double album Red Line, recorded in their own National Recording Studio.
A rarities collection, You Can Always Get What You Want, was also released that year.

In 2002, Trans Am released TA, complete with tongue-in-cheek promo photos featuring the band in boy band-esque matching white outfits. TA'''s cover art was a parody of a REO Speedwagon best-of collection. Though the album was essentially a spoof of the electroclash genre, it was mostly panned by music critics.

During the 2004 U.S. election year, Trans Am released the politically charged Liberation, an album that questioned the George W. Bush presidency and addressed such issues as the 2003 invasion of Iraq, the War on Terror, and paranoia.Sex Change, the band's sixth studio album, was released in 2007.
Following the release, Trans Am did a tour of the United States with Zombi and The Psychic Paramount, seventeen shows opening for Tool, and they played the Thrill Jockey 15th anniversary show in Chicago, Illinois.

Also in 2007, Trans Am contributed to the soundtrack of the video game After Burner: Black Falcon for the PSP.

In April 2017, Trans Am released California Hotel, an eight-song album on Thrill Jockey.

Discography
Albums
 Trans Am (1996)
 Surrender to the Night (1997)
 The Surveillance (1998)
 Futureworld (1999)
 Red Line (2000)
 TA (2002)
 Liberation (2004)
 Sex Change (2007)
 Thing (2010)
 Volume X (2014)
 California Hotel (2017)

EPs, singles
 Trans Am - 7" (split with Thigh Mastersson) (S.K.A.M., 1996)
 Tuba Frenzy - 12" (split with Wingtip Sloat) (1996)
 Illegal Ass - 12" (Happy Go Lucky, 1996)
 Who Do We Think You Are? - Australian Tour CD EP (Spunk!, 1999)
 You Can Always Get What You Want - rarities compilation CD (Thrill Jockey, 2000)
 Extremixxx - CD EP (remixes) (Thrill Jockey, 2002)

Live albums
 What Day Is It Tonight? - Trans Am Live 1993–2008 - 2xLP + DVD limited to 1500 copies (Thrill Jockey, 2009)

With the Fucking Champs
 Double Exposure - CD/LP - recorded as TransChamps (Thrill Jockey, 2001)
 Gold - CD/LP - recorded as The Fucking Am (Drag City, 2004)

See also
 Life Coach'' - solo album by Phil Manley.

References

External links
 Thrill Jockey Records
 Trans Am Fanzine
 Trouser Press entry
 Interview with Trans Am

American post-rock groups
Indie rock musical groups from Maryland
Thrill Jockey artists
Musical groups established in 1990
City Slang artists
Low Transit Industries artists